The Laredo–Colombia International Railway Bridge 3 is a proposed railway bridge across the U.S.-Mexico border to be built by the Mexican state of Nuevo León and, on the United States side, by either the city City of Laredo or Webb County in the Colombia, Nuevo León–Laredo, Texas area. This international railway bridge would be Nuevo León's first and only international rail link. It would allow Nuevo León entry to the railway trade market and compete with the bordering states of Coahuila and Tamaulipas. It is to be built south of the Colombia-Solidarity International Bridge.

The Mexican government has approved the new rail bridge. It will be constructed with United States Government and Union Pacific funds. Price tag: US$200 million.

Sources
Master Planning the Colombia, Nuevo Leon Area
May 21, 2007 Update

International bridges in Laredo, Texas
Buildings and structures in Nuevo León
Proposed bridges in the United States
Railway bridges in Mexico
Railroad bridges in Texas
Buildings and structures in Webb County, Texas
Transportation in Webb County, Texas